is an engineer. He is a global authority of Microelectromechanical systems and serves as the professor of the Tohoku University graduate school engineering graduate course.

Born in Sendai, Japan, in 1949, Masayoshi Esashi received his B.E. degree in electronic engineering in 1971 and a Doctor of Engineering degree in 1976 at Tohoku University.

Esashi served as a research associate from 1976 and an associate professor from 1981 at the Department of Electronic Engineering, Tohoku University. Since 1990 he has been a professor. Currently, he is the director of micro/nanomachining research and education center in Tohoku University. He is an associate director of the Semiconductor Research Institute.

He was a director of the Venture Business Laboratory in Tohoku University (1995–1998), and was a President of Sensor-Micromachine Society in Institute of Electrical Engineers in Japan (2002–2003). He has been a collaboration coordinator for Sendai city since 2004.

He served as a general co-chairman of the 4th IEEE Micro Electro Mechanical Workshop in 1991 held in Nara, Japan, as a general chairman of the 10th International Conference on Solid-State Sensors and Actuators (Transducers 99) in 1999 held in Sendai, Japan and Technical Program Chairman of IEEE Sensors 2006 being held in Daegu, Korea. He has also been studying microsensors and micromachined integrated systems (MEMS).

He was awarded the 2016 IEEE Jun-ichi Nishizawa Medal.

Main works

References

Japanese electronics engineers
1949 births
Living people
People from Sendai
Tohoku University alumni
Academic staff of Tohoku University